Uzybash (Uźıbaş) is a rural locality (a village) in Yazykovsky Selsoviet, Blagovarsky District, Bashkortostan, Russia. The population was 238 as of 2010. There is 1 street.

Geography 
Uzybash is located 8 km east of Yazykovo (the district's administrative centre) by road. Yazykovo is the nearest rural locality.

References 

Rural localities in Blagovarsky District